Sangareddy Assembly constituency is a constituency of Telangana Legislative Assembly, India. It is one of 10 constituencies in Medak district. It is part of Medak Lok Sabha constituency.

Thurupu Jayaprakash Reddy of Indian National Congress is the sitting MLA.

Mandals
The Assembly Constituency presently comprises the following Mandals:

Members of Legislative Assembly

Election Results

Telangana Legislative Assembly election, 2018

See also
 List of constituencies of Telangana Legislative Assembly

References

Assembly constituencies of Telangana
Medak district